Tong Jiahua (born ) is a Chinese male volleyball player. He is part of the China men's national volleyball team. On club level he plays for Shanghai Golden Age.

References

External links
 profile at FIVB.org

1992 births
Living people
Chinese men's volleyball players
Place of birth missing (living people)
21st-century Chinese people